A Place in the World may refer to:

A Place in the World (Mary Chapin Carpenter album), 1996
A Place in the World (The Black Sorrows album), 1985
A Place in the World (film), a 1991 Oscar-nominated film
A Place in the World (Upstairs, Downstairs), a 1975 fifth series Upstairs, Downstairs episode
A Place in the World (miniseries), a 1979 Australian mini series
 No Place in this World, film about bullying filmed in Citrus County, Florida in 2017